Sheriff of Cimarron is a 1945 American Western film directed by Yakima Canutt, written by Bennett Cohen, and starring Sunset Carson, Linda Stirling, Olin Howland, Riley Hill, Jack Ingram and Tom London. It was released on February 28, 1945, by Republic Pictures.

Plot

Cast  
Sunset Carson as Sunset Carson
Linda Stirling as Helen Burton
Olin Howland as Pinky Snyder 
Riley Hill as Ted Carson
Jack Ingram as M'Cord
Tom London as Frank Holden
Jack Kirk as John Burton
Robert J. Wilke as Henchman Dobie 
Jack O'Shea as Henchman Shad
Ed Cassidy as Sheriff Sam Duncan 
George Chesebro as Mine Owner
Sylvia Arslan as Girl Prankster
Dickie Dillon as Boy Prankster

References

External links 
 

1945 films
American Western (genre) films
1945 Western (genre) films
Republic Pictures films
American black-and-white films
Films directed by Yakima Canutt
1940s English-language films
1940s American films